Five ships of the Royal Navy have borne the name HMS Cynthia. A sixth was planned but never completed:

  was an 18-gun sloop launched in 1796 and broken up in 1809.
  was a 16-gun sloop listed between 1810 and 1815.
 HMS Cynthia (1826) was the Falmouth, Cornwall Post Office Packet Service packet brig , launched in 1821, that the Navy purchased in 1826, and renamed when it took over the packet service. She was wrecked off Barbados on 6 June 1827.
 HMS Cynthia was to have been a  wooden screw sloop. She was laid down in 1861 but cancelled in 1863.
  was a destroyer launched in 1898, classified as a  destroyer in 1913 and sold in 1920.
  was a  launched in 1943 and transferred to the Royal Navy under lend-lease. She was returned to the US Navy in 1947.

Royal Navy ship names